Machaeraptenus crocopera is a moth of the family Erebidae first described by William Schaus in 1905. It is found in Guyana, French Guiana and Venezuela.

References

Phaegopterina
Moths described in 1905